The 1985 Camus Singapore Masters was a professional non-ranking snooker tournament which took place between 21 and 23 August 1985 at the Dynasty Hotel in Singapore.

Steve Davis won the tournament, defeating Terry Griffiths 4–2 in the final.

Results

Group A

 Steve Davis 2–1 Tony Meo
 Steve Davis 2–0 Eddie Loh
 Eddie Loh 2–0 Tony Meo

Group B

 Terry Griffiths 2–0 Lim Koon Guan
 Dennis Taylor 2–0 Terry Griffiths
 Lim Koon Guan 2–0 Dennis Taylor

Final
 Steve Davis 4–2 Terry Griffiths

References

1985 in snooker
Sport in Singapore